Raasch is a German surname. Notable people with the surname include:

Emanuel Raasch (born 1955), German former racing cyclist
Sara Raasch (born 1989), American author of young adult fiction

See also
Rasch

German-language surnames